Fadel Abdul Rahman Shamander Chaker (also transliterated as Fadl Shaker, born 1 April 1969) is a Lebanese singer and actor. During his musical career he was signed to Al Khouyoul Records and from 2003 onwards with Rotana Records.

In 2013 and after an illustrious career as a singer, Fadel Chaker joined the ranks of imam-turned-terrorist Ahmed al-Assir and participated in the attacks on the Lebanese army which later evolved into the 2013 Sidon clash. As of 2013, he is a wanted fugitive by the Lebanese government and has hidden in Ain al-Hilweh Palestinian refugee camp. On 16 December 2020, he was sentenced in absentia to a total of 22 years of imprisonment and hard labour by a Lebanese Military Tribunal.

Background
He grew up in the Ain al-Hilweh Palestinian Refugee Camp. After Chaker declared he was proud of being part of the Palestinian people, in March 2012, the Palestinian President Mahmoud Abbas gave him honorary Palestinian citizenship and ordered that a Palestinian passport is issued in his name.

Music career

1997
In 1997, he was discovered by an agent from the recording label Stallions Company, and was signed a contract to produce three albums. 

Fadl released his first album Wallah Zaman in 1998, which had eight original songs, including "Meta Habeby Meta", "Nazra Wah". Some of these songs were composed and written by such known Arab stars like Salah El Sharnoby and Ahmed Sheta.

The second album was Baya'a El Qolob released in 1999.

2000–2002
His third album was El Hob El Adem, released in 2000. His fourth album Hobak Khayal was released in 2001, and contained 10 songs this time, and was produced by Al Khoyoul Company. It contained songs like Hazzak Ya Qalby, Men Kotr Hoby Feek, and El Maraya.

In 2002, Fadl recorded and released his first duo with the Arab singer, Nawal.

In the first album, Fadl Shaker composed three songs (Meta Habeby Meta, Maserak Habeby and Ya Tkon Habeby), and one song in his 2nd album Malet Ana A'azar.

2003–2011
In 2003, Fadl released his ballad Ya Ghayeb to Arabic radio stations in the Middle East. The song’s lyrics were written by Saudi Prince Turki Al Sudairi and composed by Greek singer/songwriter Sotis Volanis, who gave the rights of the original song “Poso Mou Leipei” to Fadel.

2012–present

In 2018, eight years after his announced retirement, Fadel Chaker returned to the music world with the release of a new single which was intended to be the introduction theme song to the new Ramadan drama series that year. However, the song was rejected in the end by the production company "in respect to the Lebanese people", and instrumental music was used in the introduction to the series instead.

That same year, he was reported to be working on a new album entitled Yalla ma'al salama.

Military involvement
In the early 2010s, Fadel Chaker announced he had joined ranks of Ahmed al-Assir radical islamic organization. As of 2013, Fadel Shaker is a wanted fugitive and terrorist for his cooperation in the 2013 Sidon clash between Ahmad al-Assir's terrorist group and the Lebanese Army in which Fadel admitted on video to having killed 2 Lebanese soldiers.

Trial and sentencing
After a trial in absentia by the Lebanese Military Tribunal, Chaker was sentenced on 16 December 2020 to a total of 22 years in prison with hard labour. He was accused by the Military Prosecutor General of having provided financial and logistical support to a "terrorist" group led by Sunni Muslim hardline cleric Ahmed al-Assir. 15 years of the sentence is for his "involvement in terrorist acts". The judge also added 7 more years of hard labour for Chaker's financing of Al-Assir's illegal armed group with the court satisfied that he had personally paid for weapons and ammunition to the group. Chaker is reportedly still hiding in Ain el-Hilweh Palestinian refugee camp near Sidon since the unfolding of military confrontation of Al-Assir's group against the Lebanese Army.

Discography

Albums
1998: Walah Zaman  [Al Khouyoul Records]
1999: Baya' El Oolob  [Al Khouyoul Records]
2000: El Hob El Adeem  [Al Khouyoul Records]
2000: Sahrat Tarab  [Master Melody]
2001: Hobak Khayal  [Al Khouyoul Records]
2003: Layali Beirut  [Rotana Records]
2003: Sa'at Tarab maa Fadl Shaker  Rotana Records
2003: Sidi Rouhi  [Rotana Records]
2004: Saharni El Shok  [Rotana Records]
2006: Allah Aalam  [Rotana Records]
2009: Baada Aal Bal  [Rotana Records]

References

External links
 
 

1969 births
Living people
21st-century Lebanese male singers
20th-century Lebanese male singers
Naturalized citizens of the State of Palestine
Lebanese Sunni Muslims
Lebanese male film actors
Lebanese male television actors